Damiano is a masculine Italian given name. Notable people with the name include:

Damiano Cunego (born 1981), Italian road bicycle racer
Damiano Damiani (born 1922), Italian screenwriter, film director, and actor
Damiano David (born 1999), Italian singer song-writer and Eurovision winner
Damiano Ferronetti (born 1984), Italian footballer
Damiano Longhi (born 1966), Italian footballer
Damiano Lugon (fl. 1970s–80s), Italian luger
Damiano Mazza (artist) (16th century), Italian Renaissance artist
Damiano Pippi (born 1971), Italian volleyball player and Olympian
Damiano Tommasi (born 1974), Italian footballer
Damiano Vannucci (born 1977), San Marinese footballer
Damiano Zenoni (born 1977), Italian footballer

See also
Damiano (surname)
Damiano (disambiguation)
San Damiano (disambiguation)

Italian masculine given names